Marian Alexandru "Alex" Tudori (born 11 October 1978 in Bucharest) is a Romanian former rugby union flanker and current coach.

Tudori had 35 caps for Romania, with 4 tries scored, 20 points in aggregate. He was called for the 2003 Rugby World Cup, playing four games, and for the 2007 Rugby World Cup, playing three games.

Honours

Club
Dinamo București
SuperLiga champion: 2006/07, 2007/08
Romanian Cup: 2007/08

External links
 
 

1978 births
Living people
Rugby union players from Bucharest
Rugby union flankers
Romania international rugby union players
Romanian rugby union players
CSA Steaua București (rugby union) players
CS Universitatea Cluj-Napoca (rugby union) players
CS Dinamo București (rugby union) players
CA Périgueux players
Venezia Mestre Rugby FC players
Expatriate rugby union players in France
Expatriate rugby union players in Italy
Romanian expatriate rugby union players
Romanian expatriate sportspeople in France
Romanian expatriate sportspeople in Italy
Romanian rugby union coaches